The Popular Resistance (Arabic: مقاومة شعبية; al-Muqawama al-Shabia) is an insurgent group that operates in Daraa Governorate. The group announced itself publicly in November of 2018. Its spokesperson Saif al-Hourani described Popular Resistance as "an extension of the Syrian revolution that has never separated from it." Popular Resistance's stated goal is to topple the government and expel pro-government militias from the country. The group, composed mainly of former Free Syrian Army fighters and men facing military conscription, has waged an insurgency against the Syrian Army and intelligence agencies, Iranian-backed militias, and reconciled rebel fighters working with the Syrian government. The group carries out guerrilla-style attacks on government positions such as checkpoints, and targets officials and soldiers in assassinations.

References 

Anti-government factions of the Syrian civil war